Cowbridge Comprehensive School is a secondary school in the town of Cowbridge, Vale of Glamorgan, near Cardiff, Wales.

The school has approximately 1,500 pupils, 1,200 of whom are in the secondary years and 300 in the sixth-form years studying for Welsh Baccalaureate, GCSEs and A-Levels.

Location
The present school buildings are located on Aberthin road, on the north-eastern outskirts of Cowbridge, in a semi-rural location.

History
When the comprehensive school opened in 1974, replacing the former grammar school, the Sixth Form (Year 12-13) was based in the former Girls' High School building and the Middle School close by in Aberthin Road, whilst the Lower School (Years 7 and 8) were housed in the south-west of the town, nearer to the town centre. On 4 December 2008, a fire started in one of the temporary buildings at the lower school at about 08:26 am. About 400 11- to 13-year-olds were evacuated to Cowbridge Leisure Centre, and smoke was visible around Cowbridge as firefighters extinguished the fire.  The lower school was temporarily closed whilst the building was made safe.  No one was in the classroom at the time of the fire.

However, after the redevelopment of the school buildings, all departments were moved onto the main site, which caters for all ages, including years 7 to 13 and ATG. The buildings at the middle school site, which was under redevelopment from early 2009, were demolished and replaced with housing.

The new school buildings are on a single site in Aberthin Road; the development is estimated to have cost £21.5 million. The redevelopment of the main site included the complete construction of a new main building (A-Block) and the refurbishment of several existing buildings. In addition to this, a multitude of sports facilities were constructed. Several of these new facilities can be used by the public outside school hours.

The new site opened to pupils for the first time in September 2010. The subsequent restriction on parents entering the school to drop off children, introduced in early 2015, resulted in criticism of the school's car park design and reports of near-accidents. In the same year, the Vale of Glamorgan Council decided to amend the design of the reception area and extend sixth-form provision, the number of pupils having risen from 312 in 2013 to an estimated 406.

In 2013, the Vale of Glamorgan Council passed the trusteeship of the Cowbridge Comprehensive School Trust to the Sir Thomas Mansel Franklen Trust, an arrangement that was inherited from the original Cowbridge Grammar School (whose main buildings were sold and redeveloped as apartments).

References

External links 

Buildings and structures in Cowbridge
Secondary schools in the Vale of Glamorgan
Educational institutions established in 1974
1974 establishments in Wales